Eugen Bamberger (19 July 1857 – 10 December 1932) was a German chemist and discoverer of the Bamberger rearrangement.

Life and achievements
Bamberger started studying medicine in 1875 at the University of Berlin, but changed subjects and university after one year, starting his studies of science at the University of Heidelberg in 1876.  He returned to Berlin in the same year and focused on chemistry. 
He received his PhD for work with August Wilhelm von Hofmann in Berlin and became assistant of Karl Friedrich August Rammelsberg at Charlottenburg and in 1883 of Adolf von Baeyer at the University of Munich, where, after his habilitation in 1891, he became associate professor for chemistry.

The Eidgenössische Technische Hochschule Zürich (ETH Zurich) appointed him professor in 1893, where he stayed until a severe illness forced him to retire from the position in 1905. 
He suffered from limited control of his right arm and severe headache for the rest of his life. Still he did research work in a private laboratory at ETH. In the last years of his life he lived at Ponte Tresa, Ticino. He died there in 1932.

Further reading
 
 Dictionary of Scientific Biography, vol. 1 (1970), S. 426 (incl. bibliography)
 Pötsch/Fischer/Müller: Lexikon bedeutender  Chemiker, Verlag H. Deutsch, 1989, S.26

External links

Short bio of  Bamberger for his 150th birthday at the ETH-Website here

1932 deaths
1857 births
19th-century German chemists
Scientists from Berlin
German emigrants to Switzerland
Academic staff of ETH Zurich
20th-century German chemists